Urosalpinx lancellottii is a species of sea snail, a marine gastropod mollusk in the family Muricidae, the murex snails or rock snails.

Description

Distribution
This marine species occurs off Chile

References

External links
 Houart, R. & Sellanes, J. (2017). Description of new species of Xanthochorus Fischer, 1884 and Urosalpinx Stimpson, 1865 (Mollusca, Gastropoda, Muricidae, Ocenebrinae) from Central Chile. American Malacological Bulletin. 35 (2): 101-110.

lancellottii
Gastropods described in 2017